The Tre Cime di Lavaredo, also called the Drei Zinnen, are three distinctive battlement-like peaks, in the Sexten Dolomites of northeastern Italy. They are probably one of the best-known mountain groups in the Alps. The three peaks, from east to west, are:
Cima Piccola / Kleine Zinne ("little peak")
Cima Grande / Große Zinne ("big peak")
Cima Ovest / Westliche Zinne ("western peak").

The peaks are composed of well-layered dolomites of the Dolomia Principale (Hauptdolomit) formation, Carnian to Rhaetian in age, as are many other groups in the Dolomites (e.g., the Tofane, the Pelmo or the Cinque Torri).

Until 1919 the peaks formed part of the border between Italy and Austria-Hungary. Now they lie on the border between the Italian provinces of South Tyrol and Belluno and still are a part of the linguistic boundary between German-speaking and Italian-speaking majorities.

Location and surroundings 

The Three Peaks rise on the southern edge of the extensive pinnacle plateau with the Langen Alm (La Grava Longa), an alpine plateau at around 2200  m to 2400  m, which here forms the end of the Rienz Valley (Valle della Rienza). There are three small mountain lakes, the Zinnenseen. This area north of the mountains to the peaks to the municipality of part Toblach in South Tyrol and the Natural Park Three Peaks (up to 2010 Sesto Dolomites Nature Park), the since 2009 is part of the UNESCO World Heritage.

The ridge of the battlements, which runs in a west-east direction, forms the border with the municipality of Auronzo di Cadore in the province of Belluno, which also represents the German-Italian language border. To the northeast, this ridge continues to the 2454 m high Paternsattel (Forcella Lavaredo), where it turns north to the mountains Passportenkopf (Croda di Passaporto, 2719 m) and Paternkofel (Monte Paterno, 2744 m). In the west it sits across the Forcella Col di Mezzo (2315 m) transition to the Zinnenkuppe (Col di Mezzo, 2254 m) and on to the 2252 m high Katzenleiterkopf (Croda d'Arghena).

To the southwest of the Drei Zinnen, the Forcella Col di Mezzo is followed by the Plano di Longeres plateau above the Valle di Rinbianco, a side valley of the Rienz Valley. Immediately south of the western pinnacle, the Forcella di Longeres saddle (2235 m) separates the Plano di Longeres from the Vallone di Lavaredo, a side valley of the Piave valley. To the south lies the Cadini group.

Cortina d'Ampezzo, 17 kilometers southwest, is the largest city in the area. Other larger towns are Toblach 13 kilometers northwest and Innichen 12 kilometers north.

Cabins and access

The most easily accessible support point around Drei Zinnen is Rifugio Auronzo (Auronzo hut, 2320 m). The cottage, which belongs to the Club Alpino Italiano (CAI), is located immediately south of the massif above Forcella di Longeres, and has good road connections to the tourist resort of Misurina (toll road). The cabin can be reached on foot from Lavaredodalen in the southeast.

About one kilometer east of Rifugio Auronzo and from there via a wide hiking trail lies the privately run Rifugio di Lavaredo (2325 m) at the southeast foot of the Kleine Zinne.

Northwest of the peaks is the summer-open, privately run farmhouse Lange Alm (also Lange Alpe) at 2296 m. One hiking trail goes from the Auronzo hut over the Forcella Col di Mezzo, another from the north comes from the Rienztal.

CAI's Dreizinnenhütte (Rifugio Locatelli, 2438 m) is located approximately one kilometer northeast of Drei Zinnen. The cabin, which is well known for its view of the north wall, can be reached from Auronzohytta via Paternsattel on a wide hiking trail. Other access options are from Sexten through Fischleinboden from the east, and also from Sexten from the north through the Innerfeldtal and through the Rienztal from Höhlenstein (Landro) in the Höhlensteintal (Valle di Landro). From the southeast, the cabin can be reached from Lange Alm.

Climate, flora and fauna

The Sexten Dolomites are surrounded by other mountain ranges on all sides, and this sheltered location in the interior of the Alps provides relatively favorable climatic conditions considering the altitude. Nevertheless, when cold fronts pass the area, rapid weather changes with fog, wind and heavy rainfall can occur, even as snow, even in high summer. In shady gorges and under north walls, the snow can lie until late summer, sometimes all year round, even though there are no glaciers here.

The alpine vegetation zone around Drei Zinnen is dominated by the raibl layer's alpine mats. The plateau around Lange Alm is one of the few areas with grazing land in the nature park. Alpines are strikingly flowery; examples of plants that thrive here are beard bell, edelweiss and Gentiana clusii. The alpine marmot is a numerous mammal; there are also hares and chamois. On the other hand, there are no ibex in the Sexten Dolomites.  Of birds there are Rock ptarmigan, ravens and golden eagles, and also hubriscan often be found hunting at this altitude. Vipers, especially the black variety, can be found at the unusual (for reptiles) altitude of 2600 m.

The vegetation on the vast clocks and on the southern flanks of the peaks is characterized by plants that are able to adapt to the constant movements of the stone clock. Examples of these are alpine cod mouth (Linaria alpina), French edible acid (Rumex scutatus), Thlaspi cepaeifolium, Potentilla nitida and alpine poppy (Papaver alpinum). In crevices are trickled Saxifraga squarrosa, cruciferous Kernera saxatilis, carnation Minuartia sedoides and the rare Paederota bonarota. In the steep, shady north walls there is hardly anyvascular plants; the most conspicuous vegetation is next to moss and low large carpets with blue-green bacteria, which appear especially on moist rock walls in the form of characteristic «ink lines». A mammal that moves all the way into the cliff areas is the snow field mouse (Chionomys nivalis). Insects (Tichodroma muraria) and alpine quays (Pyrrhocorax graculus) hunt insects here.

First ascents
The first ascent of the Cima Grande (Große Zinne) was on August 21, 1869, by Paul Grohmann with guides Franz Innerkofler and Peter Salcher. The Cima Ovest (Westliche Zinne) was first climbed exactly ten years later, on August 21, 1879, by Michel Innerkofler with G. Ploner, a tourist. The Cima Piccola (Kleine Zinne) was first climbed on July 25, 1881, by Michel and Hans Innerkofler. The routes of these three first ascents are still the normal ascent routes; the Cima Piccola's route is the most difficult of the three. A climbing route, the Dibona Kante, on the Cima Grande is named after Angelo Dibona.

Emilio Comici was the first to climb the north face of the Cima Grande in 1933 in a party of three, after an ascent time of 3 days and 2 nights.  This partly overhanging northern face is considered by climbers to be one of the great north faces of the Alps.

Tourism 

Tre Cime Natural Park is named after the famous peaks. The visitor centre provides information concerning the trails, natural and man-made landscapes of the Sexten Dolomites and it is located at the former Grand Hotel in Dobbiaco.

Numerous well-marked routes lead from the surrounding communities to and around the peaks. The most common route is from Paternkofel/Monte Paterno to the alpine hut Auronzo at 2,333 m (7,654 ft), over Paternsattel (Patern Pass) to the Locatelli alpine hut (Dreizinnenhütte) at 2,405 m (7,890 ft), and then to the peaks. There are a number of other routes as well.

Nearby communities include Auronzo di Cadore (in the province of Belluno, region of Veneto), Toblach/Dobbiaco, Sexten/Sesto, and the Puster Valley (in the province of Bolzano, region of Trentino-Alto Adige/Südtirol).

The area has also staged many finishes in Giro d'Italia.

History 

Since the front line between Italy and Austria-Hungary during World War I ran through the Tre Cime peaks, there are a number of fortifications, trenches, tunnels, iron ladders, and commemorative plaques in the area. There was intense fighting throughout the so-called "White War" between 1915 and 1917.

Film and television appearances 
Tre Cime has been used as a filming location for:
 The Young Indiana Jones Chronicles
 Solo: A Star Wars Story

Gallery

See also
 Italian front (World War I)
 List of highest paved roads in Europe
 List of mountain passes
 Lake Misurina
 Silver age of alpinism
 White War

References

Sources

External links 

 Auronzo di Cadore
 CAI Auronzo 
 The Great War in the Dolomites (Italian)
 360° Panorama view
 Homepage of the Tourism Authority

Dolomites
Great north faces of the Alps
Mountains of the Alps
Mountains of South Tyrol
Mountains of Veneto
Sexten Dolomites